"Fuck the Millennium" is a song by German group Scooter. It was released in November 1999 as the second single from the album Back to the Heavyweight Jam. It reached the top-ten in three countries, peaking at number 2 in Belgium (Flanders), number 3 in Sweden and number 4 in Finland.

Content 
The song samples  "The Passion" by Technohead. For the single release, the track was completely remixed. The new version of the song contains a sample of Jimmy Torres' song "Wheels".

The bearing vocal phrase of the song is originally from the KLF's song with the same name from 1997; "Fuck the Millennium".

Track listing

 "Fuck The Millennium" – 3:58
 "Fuck The Millennium" - Extended – 5:15
 "New Year's Day" – 6:39

Music video 
The music video of the song shows a concert of Scooter and backstage material.

Chart performance

Weekly charts

Certifications

Year-end charts

References

Scooter (band) songs
1999 singles
Songs written by H.P. Baxxter
Songs written by Rick J. Jordan
Songs written by Jens Thele
1999 songs